Into Somewhere is a studio album by Don Lanphere released by Hep Records in 1983.

Track listing
Noble Indian Song, Pt. 2
Dear Old Stockholm
Take the 'A' Train
Last Night When We Were Young
Brown Rock
I Heard You Cry Last Night
Here, Not There Silly
For Kai
In the Garden

Personnel
Don Lanphere — soprano saxophone, tenor saxophone
Jeff Fuller — double-bass
Don Friedman — piano
Ignacio Berroa — drums
Jonathan Pugh — trumpet
Dave Peterson — guitar

References

1983 albums
Don Lanphere albums
Hep Records albums